Karacakışlak is a village in the Tercan District, Erzincan Province, Turkey. The village had a population of 28 in 2021.

The hamlets of Arifbey and Kavaklı are attached to the village.

References 

Villages in Tercan District